The Bloch–Siegert shift is a phenomenon in quantum physics that becomes important for driven two-level systems when the driving gets strong (e.g. atoms driven by a strong laser drive or nuclear spins in NMR, driven by a strong oscillating magnetic field).

When the rotating wave approximation (RWA) is invoked, the resonance between the driving field and a pseudospin occurs when the field frequency  is identical to the spin's transition frequency . The RWA is, however, an approximation. In 1940 Felix Bloch and Arnold Siegert showed that the dropped parts oscillating rapidly can give rise to a shift in the true resonance frequency of the dipoles.

Rotating wave approximation
Then, in the rotating frame(), we can neglect the counter-rotating field and the Rabi frequency is

where  is the on-resonance Rabi frequency.

Bloch–Siegert shift
Consider the effect due to the counter-rotating field.
The counter-rotating field effectively dresses the system, where we can define a new quantization axis slightly tilted from the original one, with an effective detuning

and there are two solutions for 

and

Such Bloch–Siegert oscillation may become relevant in spin flipping operations at high rate. This effect can be suppressed  by using an off-resonant Λ transition.

AC-Stark shift
The AC-Stark shift is a similar shift in the resonance frequency, caused by a non-resonant field of the form  perturbing the spin. It can be derived using a similar treatment as above, invoking the RWA on the off-resonant field.

References

 L. Allen and J. H. Eberly, Optical Resonance and Two-level Atoms, Dover Publications, 1987.

Wave mechanics